The 2012 ATP Vegeta Croatia Open Umag was a men's tennis tournament played on outdoor clay courts. It was the 23rd edition of the ATP Vegeta Croatia Open Umag, and was part of the ATP World Tour 250 Series of the 2012 ATP World Tour. It took place at the International Tennis Center in Umag, Croatia, from 9 July until 15 July 2012. Marin Čilić won the singles title.

Singles main draw entrants

Seeds

1 Seedings based on rankings as of 25 June 2012

Other entrants
The following players received wildcards into the singles main draw:
  Aljaz Bedene
  Andrey Kuznetsov
  Mate Pavic

The following players received entry from the qualifying draw:
  Gorka Fraile
  Ivo Klec
  Marco Trungelliti
  Walter Trusendi

Withdrawals
  Richard Gasquet (fatigue)
  Ivo Karlović

Doubles main draw entrants

Seeds

 Rankings are as of 25 June 2012

Other entrants
The following pairs received wildcards into the doubles main draw:
  Toni Androić /  Marin Draganja
  Franko Škugor /  Antonio Veić
The following pairs received entry as alternates:
  Nikola Čačić /  Dušan Lajović
  Mateusz Kowalczyk /  David Škoch

Withdrawals
  Édouard Roger-Vasselin

Finals

Singles

 Marin Čilić defeated  Marcel Granollers, 6–4, 6–2

Doubles

 David Marrero /  Fernando Verdasco defeated  Marcel Granollers /  Marc López 6–3, 7–6(7–4)

References

External links
Official website

ATP Studena Croatia Open
2012
2012 in Croatian tennis